Club Deportivo Colegios Diocesanos is a Spanish football club based in Ávila, in the autonomous community of Castile and León. Founded on 28 February 1986, it plays in Tercera División RFEF – Group 8, holding home games at Campo de Fútbol de Sancti Spiritu, with a capacity of 1,500 people.

The club only played youth football until 2014, when it started their senior side.

Season to season

1 season in Tercera División
1 season in Tercera División RFEF

References

External links
Official website 
Fútbol Regional team profile 
Soccerway team profile

Football clubs in Castile and León
Association football clubs established in 1986
1986 establishments in Spain
Sport in Ávila, Spain